"I'm Always on a Mountain When I Fall" is a song written by Chuck Howard, and recorded by American country music artist Merle Haggard.  It was released in April 1978 as the first single and title track from the album I'm Always on a Mountain When I Fall.  The song reached number 2 on the Billboard Hot Country Singles & Tracks chart.

Chart performance

References

1978 singles
1978 songs
Merle Haggard songs
MCA Records singles